Krmar is a surname. Notable people with the surname include:

 Igor Krmar (born 1991), Serbian footballer
 Milivoj Krmar (born 1997), Serbian footballer

See also
 Kramar
 Kramer
 Kramarz